Despatch may refer to:

Business
 despatch, the inverse of demurrage, paid by the shipowner to the charterer under a voyage charter when a ship is loaded or unloaded in less time than allowed in the charter party
 Merchants Despatch, a refrigerated freight transporting company, which founded the village of Despatch, New York

Military terminology
 Despatch rider, a military motorcycle courier	
 Mentioned in despatches, a military tradition for commending notable achievements
 Military communications, particularly historically

Places
 Despatch, Eastern Cape, a small town near Uitenhage and Port Elizabeth in South Africa	
 Despatch, New York, United States, village now known as "East Rochester"

Ships
 Despatch (brig), ran aground near Newfoundland in 1828	
 [[HMS Despatch|HMS Despatch]], the name of various British Royal Navy ships	
 USS Despatch, the name of various United States Navy ships	
 Dispatch (sternwheeler), alternatively spelled Despatch'', a steamboat in Oregon, United States, in the early 20th century

See also
 Dispatch (disambiguation)